CSSC Offshore & Marine Engineering (Group) Company Limited (COMEC), formerly Guangzhou Shipyard International Company Limited (GSI), is the largest modern integrated shipbuilding enterprise based in Southern China. It was founded in 1954 and is parented by China State Shipbuilding Corporation (CSSC). It was reorganized and issued H share in Hong Kong Stock Exchange and A-share in Shanghai Stock Exchange in 1993 respectively. It is also the only shipbuilding stock listed in Hong Kong.

It is engaged in the construction and trading of vessels; manufacturing and trading of steel structure and mechanical and electrical equipment, container transportation services and shiprepairing services. It has shipyards in Guangzhou and Foshan in Guangdong Province respectively. Its Chairman is Li Zhushi.

Benefited by Chinese central government Eleventh Five-Year Plan and international flourishing shipbuilding market, the company has seen many-fold net profit rise since 2006.

References

External links
Guangzhou Shipyard International Limited
Guangzhou Shipyard

Companies listed on the Hong Kong Stock Exchange
Companies listed on the Shanghai Stock Exchange
Government-owned companies of China
Shipbuilding companies of China
H shares
Manufacturing companies based in Guangzhou
Manufacturing companies established in 1954
Chinese companies established in 1954